Operation Deadlight was the code name for the Royal Navy operation of November 1945 – February 1946 to scuttle German U-boats surrendered to the Allies after the defeat of Germany near the end of World War II.

Operation 
Of the 156 U-boats that surrendered to the allies at the end of the war, 116 were scuttled as part of Operation Deadlight. The areas were codenamed XX, YY, and ZZ. They intended to use XX as the main scuttling area, while towing 36 boats to ZZ to use as practice targets for aerial attack. YY was to be a reserve position where, if the weather was good enough, they could divert submarines from XX to sink with naval forces. Submarines that were not used for target practice were to be sunk with explosive charges, with naval gunfire as a fall-back option if that failed.

When Operation Deadlight began, the navy found that many of the U-boats were in poor condition from being moored in exposed harbours while awaiting disposal. These issues, combined with poor weather, sank 56 of the boats before they reached the scuttling areas, and those that did reach the area were generally sunk by gunfire rather than explosive charges. The first sinking took place on 17 November 1945 and the last on 11 February 1946.

U-boats excluded from Operation Deadlight
Several U-boats escaped Operation Deadlight. Some were claimed as prizes by Britain, France, Norway, and the Soviet Union. Two U-boats that survived Operation Deadlight are today museum ships.  was earmarked for scuttling, but American Rear Admiral Daniel V. Gallery argued successfully that she did not fall under Operation Deadlight. United States Navy Task Group 22.3, under then-Captain Gallery, had captured U-505 in battle on 4 June 1944. Having been captured, not surrendered at the end of the war, she survived to become a war memorial at the Museum of Science and Industry in Chicago.  was transferred to Norway by Britain in October 1948 and became the Norwegian Kaura. She was returned to Germany in 1965, to become a museum ship at Laboe in October 1971.

Salvage proposals
In the late-1990s, a firm applied to the British Ministry of Defence for salvage rights to the Operation Deadlight U-boats, planning to raise up to a hundred of them. Because the U-boats were constructed in the pre-atomic age, the wrecks contain metals that are not radioactively tainted, and are therefore valuable for certain research purposes. The ministry awarded no salvage rights, due to objections from Russia and the U.S., and potentially from Great Britain. 

Between 2001 and 2003, nautical archaeologist Innes McCartney discovered and surveyed fourteen of the U-boat wrecks; including the rare Type XXI U-boat U-2506, once under the command of Horst von Schroeter; the successful Type IXC U-boat,  commanded by Adolf Piening and the U-778, which was the most promising salvage.

In 2007, Derry City Council announced plans to raise the U-778 to be the main exhibit of a new maritime museum. On 3 October 2007, an Irish diver, Michael Hanrahan, died whilst filming the wreck as part of the salvage project. In November 2009, a spokesman from the council's heritage museum service announced the salvage project had been cancelled for cost reasons.

See also
List of Operation Deadlight U-boats
HMS Ferret (1940 shore establishment) 
Scuttling of the German fleet at Scapa Flow

References

Further reading

External links

 "Operation Deadlight" a 1945 Flight article

 
U-boats
Naval battles and operations of World War II involving the United Kingdom
Ship disposal